Roosia is a genus of flowering plants belonging to the family Aizoaceae.

Its native range is South African Republic.

Species:

Roosia grahambeckii 
Roosia lucilleae

References

Aizoaceae
Aizoaceae genera